Stuart Neil Aubrey (born 28 December 1990) is an Australian politician and former electrician, who was elected as a Labor member for Scarborough in the Western Australian Legislative Assembly at the 2021 state election.

Early life and education
Stuart Aubrey was born on 28 December 1990 in Pinjarra, Western Australia, to Ronald Edward Aubrey, a mathematics teacher, and Christine Anne Aubrey, a disability support worker. He attended North Mandurah Primary School and Frederick Irwin Anglican School, completing up to year 11. He later did a Certificate IV in Adult Preparation Studies, which is equivalent to year 12, at Tuart College.

Career
Aubrey worked for almost seven years as a fly-in fly-out electrician in the resources industry. He joined the Labor party in 2011, when he was 21. He has also worked as a Labor staffer, including for Roger Cook and John Carey.

Politics

2021 election campaign
In the 2021 Western Australian state election, Aubrey contested the electoral district of Scarborough as a Labor candidate, going up against former Liberal Party leader Liza Harvey. Scarborough was watched closely during the campaign, as it was held by the formal Liberal leader, and it was a possible seat for Labor to win. On 13 March 2021, Aubrey won the seat of Scarborough with a 16.2% swing towards him.

Political views
Aubrey is one of six Labor MP's in the current state parliament that is not factionally aligned as of 2021.

Personal life
Aubrey volunteers at the Scarboro Surf Life Saving Club. He is an atheist and is one of six openly LGBT MPs elected to parliament after the 2021 state election.

References

Living people
Australian Labor Party members of the Parliament of Western Australia
Members of the Western Australian Legislative Assembly
21st-century Australian politicians
1990 births
Gay politicians
LGBT legislators in Australia